David Noel Ramírez Padilla (born January 12, 1950) was the dean of the Monterrey Institute of Technology and Higher Education university system (ITESM) which has thirty one campuses in various parts of Mexico.  Ramirez's education and career as both an educator and administrator have all been around this university system, culminating to his former position beginning in January 2011. In addition, he has authored eight books, numerous articles, served as keynote speaker at various conferences and advised outside institutions on matters regarding accounting, finance and human development.

Life
David Noel Ramirez Padilla was born in San Juan de los Lagos, Jalisco on January 12, 1950.

Ramirez attended ITESM as student from 1967 until graduating in 1972 with a degree in Public Accounting, magna cum laude. In 1974, he obtained his master's degree in Business Administration with a special focus in Finance from the same institution, also graduating magna cum laude. In 1975, he took courses at Oklahoma State University.

He is married to Magdalena Margaín de Ramírez, with two children and four grandchildren, and currently lives in San Pedro Garza García, Nuevo León.

Career
For thirty eight years, he was a professor at ITESM teaching over 15,000 students. He also worked as a guidance counselor, department director and other positions. He became the director of the Business School at ITESM in 1981, running it for ten years. In 1991, he became the present of the Zona Norte region. From 2008 to 2010 he was Rector of the Zona Norte, Zona Sur and Zona Occidente, administrating twenty of the system's 31 campuses, as well as in charge of the development of the Universidad TecMilenio división. Ramirez was appointed the rector of the Tecnológico de Monterrey in 2010 and officially took over in January 2011. His administrative philosophy is that of mentorship, promoting development through teamwork. During his administrative career he has stressed research as a way to confront many of Mexico's problems, especially to the socioeconomically marginalized. He has also worked to establish the creation of technological parks and programs to promote entrepreneurism to spur development in various regions of Mexico.

Aside from his teaching and administrative career at ITESM, Ramirez has worked as an advisor and has been speaker at conferences in Mexico and abroad on topics such as accounting, finance and human development.  He has acted as president and / or member of several boards of directors in different associations, professional organizations, businesses and civil associations, such as the Instituto de Contadores Públicos de Nuevo León from 1991 to 1992. He has worked as an advisor to various universities, businesses, banks and civil associations. Some of his clients have been Mexican Derivatives Exchange, Grupo Financiero Margen and the San José Hospital. He was interviewed by Milenio in 2012 concerning student participation in the Mexican presidential elections, especially in social networks online.

He has written eight books which include Contabilidad Administrativa, Contabilidad de Costos, un enfoque para la Toma de Decisiones, Empresas Competitivas, Integridad en las Empresas: Ética para los Nuevos Tiempos, Estrategias Financieras para Épocas Inflacionarias Recesivas, Felicidad, ¿dónde estás?, Parejas Sedientas de Felicidad and Edad Dorada: Vívela a Plenitud. A number of his books have been used as undergraduate and graduate textbooks in Mexico and other parts of Latin America. He has published various articles on accounting, finances and human development in Mexican and international journals.

Some of his awards include: The PriceWaterhouse award for best student in accounting (1972), The Elizundia Charles  award for best student in accounting (1972), Ramón Cárdenas Coronado award  as best student in accounting  in the state of Nuevo León (1972), Outstanding professor award, by the Instituto de Contadores Públicos (1997), Award for Civic Merit “State of Nuevo León” in the field of education (1999), Knight of Saint Gregorio Magno Order from John Paul II (2002), Distinguished State of Jalisco Citizen Medal (2005) and the Lic. Ricardo Margáin Zozaya Medal for Citizenship (2006).

See also

 List of Monterrey Institute of Technology and Higher Education faculty

References

Academic staff of the Monterrey Institute of Technology and Higher Education
Living people
1950 births
Monterrey Institute of Technology and Higher Education alumni